K.F.C. V.W. Hamme is a Belgian association football club from Hamme in East Flanders. It is currently playing in the Belgian Third Division.

History 
The club first reached the second division in 1997 (as champions of the third division A) but finished 16th and lost the playoff that year.  They came back in 2002 as winner of the promotion playoff.

References 

 Official website

Association football clubs established in 1908
Football clubs in Belgium
1908 establishments in Belgium
Organisations based in Belgium with royal patronage
Hamme